Voorwaartsveld is an association football stadium in Paramaribo, Suriname. It is home to SVB Hoofdklasse club SV Voorwaarts, the oldest association football club in the country that is still active. The stadium seats 1,500 people.

Location
The Voorwaartsveld is located on the  SV Voorwaartslaan behind the NIS (Anthony Nesty Sporthal) in the southern part of Paramaribo. It is on the east end of the Jaggernath Lachmonstraat.

References

Football venues in Paramaribo
S.V. Voorwaarts
Buildings and structures in Paramaribo